La Nef (French, 'The Nave' – of a church, or (obsolete) a boat) may refer to:

 La Nef a French-Canadian early music group 
 , a French financial cooperative founded in 1979 
 , a cultural centre for modern music in Angoulême
 , a French traditionalist Roman Catholic magazine
  (La NEF), a literary magazine 
 , an early French car make

See also
Nef (disambiguation)